Laurel is a city in Yellowstone County, Montana, United States. It is the third largest community in the Billings Metropolitan Statistical Area, and is located in the Yellowstone Valley, as an east–west terminal division point of the Burlington-Northern Railroad. The population was 7,222 at the 2020 census.

Laurel is home to a Cenex Harvest States oil refinery and Montana Rail Link's Laurel Yard, the largest rail yard between St. Paul, Minnesota and Pasco, Washington.

History
Before Laurel became a city or a community, people passed through the site during the gold rush period, when gold was discovered at the Clarks Fork headwaters. They came by team and wagon, and by small steamer vessels up the Yellowstone River. The government was in the process of planning a railroad to the west coast, and had surveying crews out to map the country on the most direct route. Many of the prospectors that went west in search of gold, felt gold might be found in other parts of the state, so some returned to the Yellowstone Valley, and others came from the East to settle here. However, this did not take place until after the Custer Massacre in 1876. It was not until 1877 that the white man felt safe in the Yellowstone Valley, after the power of the Sioux was broken. So it was that while the memory of the Massacre of General Custer and his Command on the Little Big Horn River was still fresh in the minds of settlers of Montana, that a little community was established in the Yellowstone Valley.

The history of Laurel began when settlers began making their homes in the vicinity in 1879. There was a section house built that served as a depot and post office, situated about where Hobo Hill is, or near the center of the present railroad yards east of Laurel. The railroad pushed closer to Laurel from the east, up the Yellowstone Valley during the summer of 1882. Up to this time, there were about 200 people in the community. With the advent of the railroad, the population grew to 368 in 1900, 806 in 1910, and 2,338 in 1920.

Laurel was originally known as the station of Carlton, however by 1883, its name was changed to Laurel, after a local shrub. The post office was established in 1886. Laurel was considered a town in 1906, but it was not until August 1908 that it became incorporated, and two months later, on October 10, 1908, city government was established with the election of a city council and mayor.

Geography
Laurel is located at  (45.673986, -108.770893). It is 3300 feet (1006 m) above sea level.

Laurel is positioned mostly on the northern side of the Yellowstone River, near where the Clark's Fork meets the Yellowstone.

Government
The City of Laurel operates under a Mayor – Alderman form of government. Full executive authority is vested in the Mayor, who is elected at-large for a four-year term. The Mayor presides over the meetings of the City Council and appoints and charges regular and special committees of the City Council. The Mayor is eligible to vote only in cases of a tie, but he may be heard at all times. He may veto all City Council actions, including line items within a budget resolution, and his veto may be overridden by two-thirds of the whole membership of the City Council.

In November 2007, the citizens of Laurel approved a city charter with self-governing powers. This allows for the position of Chief Administrative Officer to supervise the city's operations.

Legislative authority is vested in the City Council, which is composed of eight aldermen or women elected to four-year terms by the residents of the Ward within which the respective alderman/woman resides. The City Council has management and control of the city's finances and property. The City Council has the power to adopt ordinances and regulations consistent with state and federal law for the good government, preservation of good order, benefit of trade and commerce, protection of the quality of life within the city, and, as necessary, to carry out the purposes of the government of the City of Laurel.

As of 2016, Mark Mace holds the seat of Mayor of Laurel.

Public safety

Police department
The Laurel Police Department is a member of the Montana Law Enforcement Testing Consortium (MTLETC). Rick Musson was promoted to the position of Chief of Police in August 1998, a position which he continues to hold.

The Laurel Police Department occasionally accepts applications from individuals who would like to volunteer their time to serve and protect the community. The LPD has had a reserve program for over 35 years.

Fire department
The Laurel Volunteer Fire Department provides firefighting and rescue emergency response for the community of Laurel, the  surrounding Laurel and to all those who are traveling through and find themselves in need of assistance. The LVFD also provides mutual aid to Billings, Park City, and CHS Industrial Fire Departments; and assistance as needed to several surrounding Fire Departments, including Lockwood, Red Lodge, Columbus, Molt and Joliet. 
 
In addition to firefighting and rescue, the fire department is known for its world-class Fourth of July fireworks, rated as one of the top 10 events in the Northwest, and it's Christmas holiday celebration.
 
The Fire Department is also known for award-winning Fire Prevention program. With the motto "Prevention through Education", the LVFD visits the children of Laurel several times a year, educating them on preventing fires and fire safety. The first week of October is named "Fire Prevention Week". The week is filled with visits to the schools by the Firefighters, an open house where the Department's doors are opened to the public and an hour-long program for the children of the community.

Ambulance service
The Laurel Volunteer Ambulance Service was created on June 1, 1976. The service is responsible for covering 183 square miles, including the territory within the city limits of Laurel. Before the service was formed, a local physician who owned and maintained an ambulance provided services and prehospital emergency care. As the needs of the citizens increased and calls for service became more frequent, the City felt an agency ran by city government was better equipped to provide for the people. The ambulance service has operated at the Basic Life Support level since 1976. The service is licensed through the Montana Department of Public Health and Human services, and it requires each staff member to maintain a license of at least the Emergency Medical Technician level.

The service has maintained two ambulances for transport of patients, and also provides a Quick Response SUV for various emergency purposes. The ambulance service is dispatched from the Laurel 9-1-1 Center and responds to medical emergency calls within the service area. While the service is able to provide some advanced therapies, such as intravenous access and 12-lead ECG monitoring, advanced life support services are provided mainly by American Medical Response-Billings, St. Vincent HELP Flight, Red Lodge Fire-Rescue, and Columbus Fire-Rescue. Neighboring agencies are often called to assist the service in meeting the needs of citizens, and Laurel Ambulance Service also provides mutual aid support to the neighboring agencies as well.

As of 2016, there are 22 active Emergency Medical Technicians and Paramedics providing ambulance services to the citizens of Laurel.

Economy
Cenex Harvest States oil refinery, Montana Rail Link, Laurel School District 7-70, and Wood's Power Grip comprise the major employers in Laurel. Farming and ranching provide other important mainstays.

The Billings Canal, used for irrigation, starts in Laurel.

Transportation
The City of Laurel now has two types of public transit available to City residents: a Demand-Response Service and a Van Pool to Billings.

Demand-Response Service is available Monday-Friday 10:00 am to 4:00 pm. This door-to-door service requires advance notice. Reservations must be made the day prior to need by 4:00 pm. You may make your reservation by calling the City of Laurel Public Works Department at 628–4796. On the 1st, 3rd, & 5th Wednesday of each month the Demand-Response Service will make trips to Billings. On these days the door-to-door service will be unavailable within the City of Laurel.

The City of Laurel Van Pool Service will be available to the Billings Downtown Area from Laurel for those that would like to consider carpooling to work during the week. The Van Pool bus will leave at approximately 7:30 a.m. and return at approximately 5:30 p.m. Cost to ride the Van Pool is $10 per week. There is room for 15 passengers in the Van Pool.

Laurel Municipal Airport is two miles north of town.

Education
The Laurel Public School District operates three elementary education schools (South, West, and Graff), one middle school, and one high school. Linda Filpula became superintendent in 2017 The school team is the Laurel Locomotives. School colors are purple and gold

Elementary schools
South Elementary
606 South 5th

West Elementary
502 Eighth Avenue

Graff Elementary
417 E Sixth Street

Middle school
Laurel Middle School
725 Washington Avenue

High school
Laurel High School
203 East Eighth Street

Library
Laurel Public Library serves the town.

Medical facilities
Laurel Medical Center:
1035 1st Avenue
Laurel, MT 59044
Phone: 406-628-6311

Recreation and events

Laurel is home to one of the largest Fourth of July parade and fireworks.

Laurel Aviation and Technology Week began in 1991. Students at every grade level are treated to hands on demonstrations and learn about careers. It has been held every three years except for the millennium year. In 2013 the event was cancelled due to federal budget restraints. However, in 2018, Space Day was started and students got to talk to an astronaut who was currently in the ISS (International Space Station)

Media
The Laurel Outlook is Laurel's newspaper, serving the Laurel and the surrounding areas, with a weekly publication.

Attractions
Laurel is home to the Yellowstone National Cemetery, a United States national cemetery 1 mile north of Laurel on state highway 532 / Buffalo Trail Road.

Other attractions near the Laurel area include Yellowstone National Park, the Little Bighorn Battlefield National Monument, and Pompey's Pillar National Monument (where in 1806, William Clark carved his name).

Laurel is also home to the Laurel Golf Club, an 18-hole championship golf course and restaurant.

Notable people
Chet Blaylock, former member of the Montana State Senate.
Patrick Casey, middle-distance runner at Montana State University and University of Oklahoma.

Demographics

2010 census
As of the census of 2010, there were 6,718 people, 2,790 households, and 1,765 families living in the city. The racial makeup of the city was 95.3% White, 0.4% African American, 1.5% Native American, 0.4% Asian, 0.4% from other races, and 2.1% from two or more races. Hispanic or Latino of any race were 3.0% of the population.

There were 2,790 households, of which 32.4% had children under the age of 18 living with them, 47.1% were married couples living together, 10.9% had a female householder with no husband present, 5.3% had a male householder with no wife present, and 36.7% were non-families. 31.5% of all households were made up of individuals, and 14.9% had someone living alone who was 65 years of age or older. The average household size was 2.38 and the average family size was 2.99.

The median age in the city was 37 years. 25.3% of residents were under the age of 18; 7.8% were between the ages of 18 and 24; 26.1% were from 25 to 44; 24.8% were from 45 to 64; and 15.9% were 65 years of age or older. The gender makeup of the city was 48.0% male and 52.0% female.

2000 census
As of the census of 2000, there were 6,255 people, 2,529 households, and 1,739 families living in the city. The racial makeup of the city was 96.55% White, 0.16% African American, 1.17% Native American, 0.38% Asian, 0.02% Pacific Islander, 0.69% from other races, and 1.04% from two or more races. Hispanic or Latino of any race were 2.41% of the population.

There were 2,529 households, out of which 32.6% had children under the age of 18 living with them, 54.6% were married couples living together, 10.1% had a female householder with no husband present, and 31.2% were non-families. 27.7% of all households were made up of individuals, and 14.6% had someone living alone who was 65 years of age or older. The average household size was 2.44 and the average family size was 2.96.

In the city, the population was spread out, with 25.9% under the age of 18, 7.9% from 18 to 24, 27.2% from 25 to 44, 22.2% from 45 to 64, and 16.8% who were 65 years of age or older. The median age was 38 years. For every 100 females, there were 91.4 males. For every 100 females age 18 and over, there were 89.0 males.

The median income for a household in the city was $32,679, and the median income for a family was $40,068. Males had a median income of $33,370 versus $17,201 for females. The per capita income for the city was $16,953. About 7.9% of families and 10.8% of the population were below the poverty line, including 13.3% of those under age 18 and 11.3% of those age 65 or over.

Climate

References

External links

 
 City Of Laurel Website
 Laurel Chamber of Commerce website
 Laurel Outlook Laurel's weekly newspaper

Cities in Yellowstone County, Montana
Billings metropolitan area
Railway towns in Montana
Cities in Montana